Radějovice may refer to:

 Radějovice (Strakonice District), a village in the Czech Republic
 Radějovice (Prague-East District), a village in the Czech Republic